Mika Lönnström (born 24 May 1974 in Porvoo) is a Finnish football coach who is currently Director of Sport at HIFK Fotboll in Finland's Veikkausliiga.

Career

Finland 
Lönnström started his coaching career at the age of 16 at FC Futura in Finland. After completing his UEFA A Licence (Welsh FA) qualification in 1998 he began working as a coach and director of coaching for several clubs.

After many successful years as a coach and Technical director of Finnish Veikkausliiga team MYPA and after finalising a Degree of Football Management from Finnish FA he was appointed by Gnistan as a club executive director and head of operations.

United States 
In 2007 Lönnström took an educational break to work with Elite Football Camps for youth players in the United States where he became a staff member of University of Kentucky football program. In 2008, he joined the coaching staff of U.S. Soccer in the Olympic Development Program Camps and University of Minnesota's Gopher Soccer Camps. Lönnström also made educational visits with MLS clubs like Columbus Crew and Chicago Fire

Thailand 
In May 2012 Lönnström was appointed Academy Director and first team Assistant Coach of Roi Et United FC of Thailand. He then became Head Coach of the first team the following year.

In his first season in charge he managed to get Roi Et United FC promoted to Thai Division 1 League. In 2013, he was also appointed as Assistant Coach of the Thailand U16 National Team on a part-time basis.

In April 2014 Roi Et United FC mutually terminated his contract to allow him to become Head Coach of Police United FC of the Thailand Premier League. As a result, he became the first ever Finnish head coach to manage in a top flight division of Southeast Asian football.

Before Lönnström took charge of Police United FC at the start of May, the team were languishing 17th in the Thailand Premier League with seven points from nine matches. Under his management they picked up 16 points from nine matches before him and his coaching staff resigned in June under controversial circumstances.

Maldives 
In August 2014 Lönnström was appointed Head Coach of Maldives' most successful football club New Radiant SC. The club went on a long unbeaten streak under him and secured the Dhivehi League title and also President's Cup.

After winning the double in Maldives, Lönnström was awarded the Coach of the Year award in February 2015 at Haveeru Sports Awards.

The Maldivian league champions qualified for the AFC Cup and Lönnström became the first ever Finnish and Nordic football coach to manage a club in this competition. New Radiant SC started their new season with an away match in AFC Cup against Persib Bandung of the (Indonesia Super League). The match was played in front of a full capacity crowd of 30,000 in March 2015. New Radiant SC were beaten 4–1 and as a result, Lönnström and the club mutually terminated his contract a few days later.

After his spell in the Maldives, Lönnström took charge of Thai Premier League side Saraburi FC in April 2015. The newly promoted team were struggling to adapt to the Thailand top flight and were bottom of the table when Lönnström took over. However, after just five league matches at the club, Lönnström resigned in June.

Tanzania 

In July 2015 Lönnström was appointed as a Head Coach of Tanzanian Premier League side Maji Maji FC. The club from Songea gained promotion the previous season and were determined to stay in the top flight by bringing in international coaching.

Lönnström's side made a bright start to the season by winning their first two matches 1–0. By the December mid-season break, the club had collected 11 points from ten matches and were sitting comfortably mid-table. But following difficulties off the pitch Lönnström resigned with immediate effect.

After leaving Maji Maji FC, he focused on projects with his coaching group, The MnM coaching, which is a professional and international coaching group that aims to develop football coaching around the world.

Slovakia 

In December 2016 Lönnström became Head Coach of FC ŠTK 1914 Šamorín in the Slovakian 2. Liga in the middle of the season. The club have a partnership with one of Brazil's biggest football clubs, Fluminense FC. Lönnström guided his side into the Promotion Group play-offs by winning three of their first four matches. By the end of the season they had won 10 of their 16 league matches since Lönnström took over to finish fourth in the table and just six points from the top.

Finland 

Lönnström left FC ŠTK 1914 Šamorín in February 2018 before joining HIFK Fotboll as Director of Sport in Finland's Ykkönen. During his first season at the club, HIFK won promotion back to Veikkausliiga at the first attempt. Since then, Lönnström has helped the club finish 7th in 2019 and 8th in 2020.

Honours

Manager
Roi Et United
 Thai Regional League Division 2 Winner: 2013
Regional League North-East Division Winner: 2012, 2013
New Radiant SC
 Dhivehi League Title 2014
 President's Cup 2014

Individual awards:
 Coach of the month in Thai Premier League 2014
 Coach of the Year 2014 in Maldives

References

External links
Article

1974 births
Living people
People from Porvoo
Finnish football managers
Finnish expatriate sportspeople in Thailand
Expatriate football managers in Thailand
Finnish expatriate sportspeople in the Maldives
Expatriate football managers in the Maldives
Finnish expatriate sportspeople in Slovakia
Expatriate football managers in Slovakia
FC ŠTK 1914 Šamorín managers
2. Liga (Slovakia) managers
Sportspeople from Uusimaa